Kmele Foster (born October 31, 1980) is an American telecommunications entrepreneur and political commentator. He is co-founder and vice president of the telecommunications consultancy TelcoIQ and is currently a co-host of the podcast The Fifth Column.

Foster is the former chairman of the America's Future Foundation, a non-profit political activist organization based out of Washington, D.C. He was the co-host of the Fox Business Network program The Independents, along with Reason magazine editor Matt Welch and Kennedy host Lisa Kennedy Montgomery. He is now lead producer at media company Freethink.

Foster endorsed Justin Amash in the 2020 Libertarian Party presidential primaries.

References

External links
 Kmele Foster at Reason.com
 @kmele, Foster's Twitter account
 

1980 births
Living people
African-American television hosts
American libertarians
American podcasters
American political commentators
American technology chief executives